Events in the year 1870 in Uruguay.

Incumbents
President: Lorenzo Batlle y Grau

Events
September 12 - Revolution of the Lances: Battle of Paso Severino

Births

Deaths

References

 
1870s in Uruguay